Lecirelin, sold under the brand names Dalmarelin, Ovucron, and Reproreline, is a short-acting gonadotropin-releasing hormone agonist (GnRH agonist) medication which is used in veterinary medicine in Europe and Israel. It is a GnRH analogue and a synthetic peptide, specifically a nonapeptide. The drug was introduced for veterinary use by 2000. It is used in form of the acetate salt.

See also
 Gonadotropin-releasing hormone receptor § Agonists

References

GnRH agonists
Peptides
Veterinary drugs